Electric Hippies were an Australian band formed by ex Noiseworks members Justin Stanley and Steve Balbi. The pair also used the same name for their production work. They released a self titled album in 1994 and had a top 30 single with "Greedy People". 

As record producers they have worked with Vincent Stone, Juice, Jenny Morris, Nikka Costa and Pearls & Swine. 

In February 2023, Balbi and Stanley revealed Electric Hippies and in the studio and working on new material.

Band members
Justin Stanley - guitar, keyboards, vocals
Steve Balbi  - bass, guitar, vocals

Discography

Albums

Singles

Awards

ARIA Music Awards
The ARIA Music Awards is an annual awards ceremony that recognises excellence, innovation, and achievement across all genres of Australian music. The Electric Hippies have been nominated for two awards.

|-
| rowspan="2"| 1995
| Bob Ellis for "Greedy People"
| ARIA Award for Best Video
| 
|-
| Simon Anderson for The Electric Hippies 
| ARIA Award for Best Cover Art
| 
|-

References

Australian pop music groups
Musical groups established in 1993
Psychedelic pop music groups